William James "Doc" Zeigler (June 30, 1896 – August 6, 1989) was an American Negro league outfielder in the 1910s.

A native of Thomaston, Georgia, Zeigler played for the West Baden Sprudels in 1914. He died in Chicago, Illinois in 1989 at age 93.

References

External links
Baseball statistics and player information from Baseball-Reference Black Baseball Stats and Seamheads

1896 births
1989 deaths
West Baden Sprudels players
20th-century African-American sportspeople